was a Japanese lexicographer, linguist, and historian. He is best known for two Japanese-language dictionaries that he edited, Genkai ("sea of words", 1891) and its successor Daigenkai ("great sea of words", 1932–1937),  and for his studies of Japanese grammar.

Biography
Ōtsuki Fumihiko was born in the  section of Edo in what is now part of Ginza, Tokyo. He was the third son of the Confucian scholar and gunnery expert  and the grandson of the Confucian and Western scholar . Following family tradition, he embarked on Western studies, studying English and mathematics at the Kaiseijo school (one of the predecessors of the University of Tokyo).

As a youth, Ōtsuki was employed as an advisor to Sendai Domain, and fought at the Battle of Toba–Fushimi in the Boshin War of the Meiji Restoration on the losing Tokugawa Bakufu side. He later assisted in the formation of the Ōuetsu Reppan Dōmei.
After the Meiji Restoration, he worked as a translator while learning English from Americans in the port city of Yokohama. Around 1872, he joined in the editing of an English–Japanese dictionary for the Ministry of Education, and he later worked on textbooks and taught at schools in Miyagi Prefecture.

Although Ōtsuki paid for the original publication expenses for Genkai himself, it was soon republished and expanded in commercial editions that went through over a thousand printings. Modeled in part on Western monolingual dictionaries, Genkai gave not only basic information about words—their representations in kana and kanji and their definitions in Japanese—but also pronunciations and etymologies and citations of their use. Its successor, the four-volume Daigenkai, though published under Ōtsuki's name and based in part on his work, appeared some years after his death and was completed by other lexicographers.

References
 Goodman, Grant. Japan and the Dutch 1600–1853. Routledge Curzon (2000). 
 Keene, Donald. Dawn to the West. Columbia University Press; 2Rev Ed edition (1998). 
 Koerner E. F. K., Concise History of the Language Sciences. Pergamon (1995). 

Japanese lexicographers
People from Tokyo
Linguists from Japan
1847 births
1928 deaths
Samurai
People of Meiji-period Japan